Slender may refer to:

Term
 Gracility or slenderness

Literature 

 Abraham Slender, a character in William Shakespeare's The Merry Wives of Winsor

Slender Man
Slender Man, a fictional supernatural character
Slender Man stabbing, an attempted murder inspired by the story of the "Slender Man"

Video games
 Slender: The Eight Pages, previously known as Slender, a 2012 video game based on "Slender Man"
 Slender: The Arrival, the sequel to Slender: The Eight Pages
 Slender Rising, a game based on the "Slender Man"
 Slender Rising 2, sequel to Slender Rising

Films
 Slender Man (film), a 2018 film based on the "Slender Man"
 Beware the Slenderman, a 2016 documentary based on the "Slender Man stabbing"

See also
 Slender group
 Gracilis (disambiguation)